Verkhnyaya Pyshma is a town in Sverdlovsk Oblast, Russia, located  north of Yekaterinburg. Population:

History
It was founded in 1660 as the village (selo) of Pyshminskoye, which was named after the Pyshma River. A copper mine opened here in 1856. Town status was granted to it in 1946.

Town development in 20th century is closely related to copper production. The factory called Uralelectromed developed here and in 1990s it became the main company of UMMC holding. The company Ural Locomotives is also located there, it produces modern Russian locomotives and trains such as 2ES10 (the most powerful Russian locomotive) and Lastochka suburban EMU based on Siemens Desiro.

Administrative and municipal status
Within the framework of the administrative divisions, it is, together with the town of Sredneuralsk and twenty-seven rural localities, incorporated as the Town of Verkhnyaya Pyshma—an administrative unit with the status equal to that of the districts. As a municipal division, Verkhnyaya Pyshma and twenty-four rural localities are incorporated as Verkhnyaya Pyshma Urban Okrug. The town of Sredneuralsk, together with three other rural localities, is incorporated separately as Sredneuralsk Urban Okrug.

Coat of arms
The coat of arms of the town is a griffin holding a gold mirror of Venus. The griffin is the guard of riches and also the symbol of strength of mind. The mirror of Venus represents copper, which is mined in the region.

Ecology and health issues
In late July 2007, the town was hit by an outburst of atypical pneumonia, with 200 infected and 170 death cases. According to the official information, the infection was caused by Legionella pneumophila virus, which spread through the water supply network. However, there was much speculation that biological warfare (similarly to Sverdlovsk anthrax leak in 1979), or the pollution from chemical industry, is responsible for the infection.

Twin towns – sister cities

Verkhnyaya Pyshma is twinned with:
 Zhodzina, Belarus

References

Notes

Sources

Cities and towns in Sverdlovsk Oblast